く, in hiragana or ク in katakana, is one of the Japanese kana, which each represent one mora.  Both represent  and their shapes come from the kanji 久.

This kana may have a dakuten added, transforming it into ぐ in hiragana, グ in katakana and gu in Hepburn romanization.

A handakuten (゜) does not occur with ku in normal Japanese text, but it may be used by linguists to indicate a nasal pronunciation .

In the Ainu language, the katakana ク can be written as small ㇰ, representing a final k sound as in アイヌイタㇰ Ainu itak (Ainu language). This was developed along with other extended katakana to represent sounds in Ainu that are not found in standard Japanese katakana.

Stroke order

Other communicative representations

 Full Braille representation

 Computer encodings

References

Specific kana